Atrilinea roulei is species of cyprinid in the genus Atrilinea. It inhabits the Qiantang River in China, and has a maximum length of 15 cm (5.9 inches), and a common length of 12 cm (4.7 inches).

References

Cyprinidae
Freshwater fish of China
Cyprinid fish of Asia